Duri Mohammed (1936– 2015) was an Ethiopian government official. He is known for co-founding the Harari National League.

Duri Mohammed was born in Harar in 1936. He earned his BA in 1959 from what was called University College of Addis Ababa, now Addis Ababa University. From there, he was sent to earn an MA in economics from University of California, Berkeley (1962). He completed his doctorate at the University of Reading in the UK (1972). Duri was president of Addis Ababa University (1977-1985) and (1993-1995). He served as Minister for Planning and Economic Development under the Meles Zenawi administration as well as Ethiopian ambassador to the United Nations. Upon Duri's controversial appointment as president of Addis Ababa University in 1993 by the new government of Ethiopia, 42 staff members were fired together with former president Alemayehu Teferra.

References

1930s births
2015 deaths
Ethiopian economists
People from Harari Region
Addis Ababa University alumni
University of California, Berkeley alumni
Alumni of the University of Reading
Academic staff of Addis Ababa University
Ethiopian government officials